Tobipuranga is a genus of beetles in the family Cerambycidae, containing the following species:

 Tobipuranga auricollis (Dalman in Schoenherr, 1817)
 Tobipuranga auripes (Bates, 1870)
 Tobipuranga belti (Bates, 1872)
 Tobipuranga chlorogaster (Aurivillius, 1910)
 Tobipuranga ignea (Bates, 1870)
 Tobipuranga longicornis (Bates, 1870)
 Tobipuranga ruficoxis (Bates, 1870)
 Tobipuranga ybyra Napp & Martins, 1996

References

Heteropsini